Guerino Bruno Mazzola (born 1947) is a Swiss mathematician, musicologist, and jazz pianist, as well as a writer.

Education and career
Mazzola obtained his PhD in mathematics at University of Zürich in 1971 under the supervision of Herbert Groß and Bartel Leendert van der Waerden. In 1980, he habilitated in Algebraic Geometry and Representation Theory. In 2000, he was awarded the medal of the Mexican Mathematical Society. In 2003, he habilitated in Computational Science at the University of Zürich.

Mazzola was an associate professor at Laval University in 1996 and at Ecole Normale Supérieure in Paris in 2005. Since 2007, he is professor at the School of Music at the University of Minnesota. From 2007 to 2021 he was the president of the Society for Mathematics and Computation in Music.

Mazzola is well known for his music theory book The Topos of Music. The result has drawn dissent from Dmitri Tymoczko, who said of Mazzola: "If you can't learn algebraic geometry, he sometimes seems to be saying, then you have no business trying to understand Mozart."

Records
Mazzola has recorded several free jazz CDs with musicians like Mat Maneri, Heinz Geisser, Sirone, Jeff Kaiser, Scott Fields, Matt Turner and Rob Brown. His 2010 album Dancing the Body of Time was recorded in concert at the Pit Inn in Tokyo.

Playing style
A reviewer of Dancing the Body of Time mentioned similarities between Mazzola's playing style and that of Cecil Taylor. This was also mentioned by the AllMusic reviewer of Mazzola's earlier Toni's Delight: Live in Seoul, who also stated that Mazzola "infuses his incredible technique with a blues aesthetic and a sometimes-romantic stamp, overwhelming everything in his path".

Bibliography
Gruppen und Kategorien in der Musik. Hermann (1985) .
Rasterbild - Bildraster, CAD-gestützte Analyse von Raffaels "Schule von Athen". Springer (1987) .
Geometrie der Töne. Birkhäuser (1990) .
Ansichten eines Hirns. Birkhäuser (1990) .
The Topos of Music, Geometric Logic of Concepts, Theory, and Performance. Birkhäuser (2002) .
Perspectives in Mathematical Music Theory.. EpOs (2004). .
Comprehensive Mathematics for Computer Scientists I & II here and Errata here
Elemente der Musikinformatik. Birkhäuser (2006) .
La vérité du beau dans la musique. Delatour/IRCAM (2007) .
Flow, Gesture, and Spaces in Free Jazz—Towards a Theory of Collaboration. Springer (2009) .
Musical Performance. Springer (2011) .
Musical Creativity—Strategies and Tools in Composition and Improvisation. Springer (2011) .
Computational Musicology in Hindustani Music. Springer (2014) .
Computational Counterpoint Worlds. Springer (2015) .
Cool Math for Hot Music. Springer (2016) .
All About Music. Springer (2016) .
The Topos of Music, 2nd ed. Vol. I: Theory. Springer (2017) .
The Topos of Music, 2nd ed. Vol. II: Performance. Springer (2017) .
The Topos of Music, 2nd ed. Vol. III: Gestures. Springer (2017) .
The Topos of Music, 2nd ed. Vol. IV: Roots. Springer (2017) .
Basic Music Technology. Springer (2018) .
The Future of Music. Springer (2020) .
Making Musical Time. Springer (2021) .
Functorial Semiotics for Creativity in Music and Mathematics. Springer (2022) .

Discography
Mazzola/Piano Solo Kelvin Null OMP Records 1001 LP
Mazzola/Piano Solo Akroasis Wergo SM 1024 LP
Mazzola/Moor/Sollberger Aus dem Hinterhalt OMP Records 1002 LP
Q4 Orchestra Lyons' Brood Creative Works CW 1018 CD
Guerino Mazzola Synthesis SToA music ST-71.1001 CD
Jan Beran Immaculate Concept SToA music ST-71.1002 CD
Q4 Orchestra Yavapai Creative Works CW 1028 CD
Rissi/Mazzola/Geisser Fuego Creative Works CW 1029 CD
Brown/Mazzola/Geisser Orbit Music & Arts CD-1015 CD
Mazzola/Geisser Toni's Delight Cadence Jazz Records 1090 CD
Mazzola/Geisser/Fields/Turner Maze Quixotic Records 5002 CD
Mazzola/Geisser /Fields/Maneri Heliopolis Cadence Jazz Records 1122 CD
Mazzola/Geisser Folia Silkheart Records SHCD 153 CD
Mazzola/Geisser/Rissi Tierra Cadence Jazz Records 1130 CD
Mazzola/Geisser/Rissi Agua Cadence Jazz Records, 1150 CD
Mazzola/Geisser Someday Silkheart Records 154 CD
Mazzola/Geisser/Fields/Maneri Chronotomy BlackSaint 120173-2 CD
Mazzola/Geisser/Kato/Saga Live at Airegin Ayler Records aylDL-056 CD
Mazzola/Geisser/Rissi Herakleitos Ayler Records aylDL-069 CD
Mazzola/Geisser/Rissi Aire Cadence Jazz Records 1130 CD
Mazzola/Geisser/Kaiser/Sirone Liquid Bridges CD in Springer book Flow, Gesture, and Spaces
Mazzola/Geisser/Onuma Dancing the Body of Time Cadence Jazz Records 1239 CD
Mazzola/Park Passionate Message Silkheart Records 159 CD
Mazzola/Geisser/Kita Ma pfMentum PFMCD116
Mazzola/Lubet Deep State pfMentum PFMCD119
Mazzola/Geisser Live at Le Classique pfMentum PFMCD126
Mazzola/Leo/Lubet/Zielinski/Holdman Negative Space pfMentum PFMCD136
Mazzola/Lubet Subtle pfMentum PFMCD141

References

External links

20th-century Swiss mathematicians
21st-century Swiss mathematicians
Free jazz pianists
Swiss jazz pianists
Swiss music theorists
1947 births
Living people
People from Dübendorf
Cadence Jazz Records artists
21st-century pianists
University of Zurich alumni
University of Minnesota faculty
Academic staff of the École Normale Supérieure
Academic staff of Université Laval